Atkinson Township is a township in Carlton County, Minnesota, United States. The population was 319 as of the 2000 census.

History
Atkinson Township was named for John Atkinson, a local settler and railroad employee.

Geography

Unincorporated community
 Atkinson

Major highways
  Interstate 35

Lakes
 Bob Lake (vast majority)
 Park Lake

Adjacent townships
 Twin Lakes Township (east)
 Mahtowa Township (south)

Cemeteries
The township contains the following cemeteries: Bethel and Salem.

Demographics
As of the census of 2000, there were 319 people, 124 households, and 93 families residing in the township.  The population density was 18.4 people per square mile (7.1/km2).  There were 198 housing units at an average density of 11.4/sq mi (4.4/km2).  The racial makeup of the township was 98.12% White, 0.31% Native American, 0.94% Asian, and 0.63% from two or more races. 24.6% were of German, 18.0% Swedish, 15.8% Norwegian, 9.2% Finnish, 7.0% Polish and 6.6% English ancestry according to Census 2000.

There were 124 households, out of which 28.2% had children under the age of 18 living with them, 66.1% were married couples living together, 5.6% had a female householder with no husband present, and 24.2% were non-families. 19.4% of all households were made up of individuals, and 5.6% had someone living alone who was 65 years of age or older.  The average household size was 2.57 and the average family size was 2.96.

In the township the population was spread out, with 22.6% under the age of 18, 5.6% from 18 to 24, 31.0% from 25 to 44, 26.0% from 45 to 64, and 14.7% who were 65 years of age or older.  The median age was 40 years. For every 100 females, there were 100.6 males.  For every 100 females age 18 and over, there were 107.6 males.

The median income for a household in the township was $49,375, and the median income for a family was $55,875. Males had a median income of $40,000 versus $32,500 for females. The per capita income for the township was $18,479.  None of the families and 0.6% of the population were living below the poverty line, including no under eighteens and none of those over 64.

References
 United States National Atlas
 United States Census Bureau 2007 TIGER/Line Shapefiles
 United States Board on Geographic Names (GNIS)

Townships in Carlton County, Minnesota
Townships in Minnesota